Floydsburg is a rural unincorporated community in Oldham County, Kentucky, United States. It is located southeast of Crestwood on KY 1408.

This community was named its location near pioneer James John Floyd's Ford Station.  The Floyds Fork, a tributary of the Salt River, starts nearby.

References

  

Unincorporated communities in Oldham County, Kentucky
Unincorporated communities in Kentucky